Board of Intermediate and Secondary Education may refer to the following:

Bangladesh
 Board of Intermediate and Secondary Education, Chittagong
 Board of Intermediate and Secondary Education, Dhaka
 Board of Intermediate and Secondary Education, Barisal
 Board of Intermediate and Secondary Education, Comilla
 Board of Intermediate and Secondary Education, Jessore
 Board of Intermediate and Secondary Education, Mymensingh
 Board of Intermediate and Secondary Education, Rajshahi
 Board of Intermediate and Secondary Education, Sylhet
 Board of Intermediate and Secondary Education, Dinajpur

Pakistan

Islamabad 
 Federal Board of Intermediate and Secondary Education

Khyber Pakhtunkhwa 
 Board of Intermediate and Secondary Education, Peshawar
 Board of Intermediate and Secondary Education, Abbottabad
 Board of Intermediate and Secondary Education, Swat
 Board of Intermediate and Secondary Education, Bannu

Punjab 
 Board of Intermediate and Secondary Education, Bahawalpur
 Board of Intermediate and Secondary Education, Dera Ghazi Khan
 Board of Intermediate and Secondary Education, Faisalabad
 Board of Intermediate and Secondary Education, Gujranwala
 Board of Intermediate and Secondary Education, Lahore
 Board of Intermediate and Secondary Education, Multan
 Board of Intermediate and Secondary Education, Rawalpindi
 Board of Intermediate and Secondary Education, Sahiwal
 Board of Intermediate and Secondary Education, Sargodha

Sindh 
 Board of Intermediate and Secondary Education, Hyderabad
 Board of Intermediate and Secondary Education, Sukkur
 Board of Intermediate and Secondary Education, Larkana

Azad Jammu and Kashmir 
 AJK Board of Intermediate and Secondary Education, Mirpur